Kuhdasht-e Jonubi Rural District is a rural district (dehestan) in the Central District of Kuhdasht County, Lorestan Province, Iran. At the 2006 census, its population was 16,923, in 3,445 families.  The rural district has 51 villages.

References 

Rural Districts of Lorestan Province
Kuhdasht County